The low basis theorem is one of several basis theorems in computability theory, each of which showing that, given an infinite subtree of the binary tree , it is possible to find an infinite path through the tree with particular computability properties. The low basis theorem, in particular, shows that there must be a path which is low; that is, the Turing jump of the path is Turing equivalent to the halting problem .

Statement and proof 

This is equivalent, by definition, to the statement that each infinite computable subtree of the binary tree  has an infinite path of low degree.

The proof uses the method of forcing with  classes (Cooper 2004:330).

The forcing argument can also be formulated explicitly as follows. For a set X⊆ω, let f(X) = Σ{i}(X)↓2−i, where {i}(X)↓ means that Turing machine i halts on X (with the sum being over all such i). Then, for every nonempty (lightface)  S⊆2ω, the (unique) X∈S minimizing f(X) has a low Turing degree. In other words, whether a machine halts on X is forced by a finite condition, with allows for X′ = 0′.

Application 

One application of the low basis theorem is to construct completions of effective theories so that the completions have low Turing degree. For example, the low basis theorem implies the existence of PA degrees strictly below .

References 
  
 .
 
  The original publication, including additional clarifying prose. 
  Theorem 1.8.37.
  

Computability theory